HŠK Građanski (alternatively spelled Gradjanski or Gradanski), also known as 1. HŠK Građanski or fully Prvi hrvatski građanski športski klub, was a Croatian football club established in Zagreb in 1911 and dissolved in 1945. The club had a huge influence on the development of football in Croatia and Kingdom of Yugoslavia and achieved its greatest success in the period between the two World Wars.

History

The golden era

In 1911, when Croatia was still part of the Austro-Hungarian Empire, Građanski was founded in Zagreb by Andrija Mutafelija and a few of his friends in response to rumors that a football club that was meant to play in the Hungarian football league (as opposed to the Croatian Sports Union) was about to be established. Građanski was therefore founded as a multi-sports club with a distinctly Croatian identity intended to cater to citizens of Zagreb, with sections dedicated to football, handball, and cycling. At first they used grounds in Zagreb's neighbourhoods of Tuškanac, Martinovka and Kanal, until they built their own stadium at Koturaška street, which was officially opened in 1924 by Stjepan Radić, a prominent Croatian politician.

The club lost their first ever game to city rivals HAŠK (5–1) but soon became popular and were widely supported by Zagreb's working class (in contrast to HAŠK, which was an academic sports club and was generally seen as a club affiliated with the University of Zagreb and its students, and popular with the middle class). In the following years, a healthy rivalry developed between the two city clubs, and after the Kingdom of Yugoslavia First League was launched on a national level in 1923, Građanski's greatest rivals outside Zagreb soon became BSK Belgrade and Hajduk Split. During the 1920s and 1930s Građanski became the most popular club in Zagreb as they won five Yugoslav championship titles (1923, 1926, 1928, 1937, 1940 and were runners-up in 1925 and 1939).

International games
Internationally, the club went on several successful tours – on one of these, in 1923 in Spain, Građanski beat Barcelona and Athletic Bilbao. The club often toured to Austria and Hungary and played friendly matches with top local sides. In 1936 they went on tour to England and Scotland where they adopted the WM formation which helped them win the 1936–1937 Yugoslav championship. Márton Bukovi, who started using the formation as Građanski manager in 1936, introduced it to Hungary in the late 1940s and later modified it into the now famous WW system which brought the Hungary national football team to the final game of the 1954 World Cup and which was later exported on to Brazil as the 4–2–4 formation.

Građanski were also hosts to friendlies with prominent European teams. In June 1934, Građanski hosted a 0–0 draw with the Brazil national football team (with football legends such as Leônidas and Waldemar in their lineup), and in May 1936 Liverpool FC suffered their first continental defeat in Zagreb, a 5–1 thrashing in front of an audience of 10,000 with August Lešnik scoring a hat-trick and Berry Nieuwenhuys claiming a consolation goal for the Reds. Also in 1936, the club visited Scotland where at Tynecastle they drew 4–4 with Heart of Midlothian.

Građanski in Europe
The club competed in the Mitropa Cup, the first European international club competition, on three occasions – in 1928, 1937 and 1940. In 1928 Građanski were knocked out in the two-legged quarterfinal by Viktoria Žižkov of Czechoslovakia with 4:8 on aggregate. Nine years later, Građanski exited early again after suffering a 1:6 aggregate loss to Genova 1893 FBC. In 1940 they beat the Hungarian side Újpest FC (5:0 on aggregate) in the quarterfinal, only to be defeated by Rapid Bucharest in the semifinal. Both legs ended without goals, so a playoff game in Subotica was held, which ended 1:1. Rapid progressed to the final on a coin toss, but the final game (against Ferencváros) was never played because of the outbreak of World War II.

World War II
Having been invaded and occupied by the Nazi Germany in 1941, the Kingdom of Yugoslavia was dissolved and sports competitions in the nation were suspended. One exception was the Independent State of Croatia (NDH), which, as an Axis member, enjoyed peace so the NDH continued to hold national competitions featuring prominent Croatian clubs. Four of these seasons were started (1941, 1941–42, 1942–43 and 1943–44) but only the second and third editions were actually finished, with Građanski winning the 1942–43 season.

When the war ended in 1945, the club was formally disbanded by the new communist government (along with city rivals HAŠK and Concordia Zagreb) and its archives were destroyed, in retribution for competing in the wartime fascist-sponsored football league. The club's last official game was a 2–2 draw against HAŠK on 10 April 1945.

In June 1945 Dinamo Zagreb was established to take its place as Zagreb's foremost football powerhouse. The newly established Dinamo club adopted Građanski's colours and nickname, and inherited its pre-war fan base, and in 1969 even introduced a club badge which strongly resembled Građanski's old emblem. Initially, Dinamo also used Građanski's Stadion Koturaška, before moving to an expanded version of HAŠK's former ground at Stadion Maksimir in 1948, where it remains to this day.

Many former Građanski players continued their career at Dinamo after the war (including Ivan Jazbinšek, August Lešnik, Zvonimir Cimermančić, Milan Antolković) as well as their coach Márton Bukovi, while some others moved to FK Partizan in Belgrade, which was established after the war as the official Yugoslav Army club (these included Florijan Matekalo and Stjepan Bobek).

Notable players
Since Zagreb was home to the Croatian-named Nogometni Savez Jugoslavije (Football Association of Yugoslavia) since its establishment in 1919 and both Građanski as a club and Zagreb as a city were regarded as local football powerhouses (with three of the city's clubs winning national championship titles between 1923 and 1940 (Concordia Zagreb and HAŠK Zagreb along with Građanski), Građanski players often earned caps for the Kingdom of Yugoslavia national football team, mostly for games at Olympic tournaments, the Balkan Cup and World Cup qualifiers.

In late 1929 the association dissolved after disagreements between the Zagreb and Belgrade regional branches and this resulted in the association being moved to Belgrade in May 1930 where it adopted the Serbian name Fudbalski Savez Jugoslavije. Because of this, Croatian players boycotted the national team which was scheduled to compete at the 1930 World Cup in July in Uruguay, so Yugoslavia sent a squad consisting entirely of Serbian players called up from Belgrade clubs (mostly from BSK Beograd, BASK and SK Jugoslavija). The team managed to beat Brazil 2–1 and Bolivia 4–0 but were then crushed by Uruguay 1–6 in the semi-final. Since Yugoslavia failed to qualify for the next two World Cups in 1934 and 1938, this meant that no Croat appeared at World Cup tournaments until Yugoslavia's next appearance at the 1950 World Cup. By that time Građanski had ceased to exist, although Stjepan Bobek, who initially played for Građanski 1943–1945 before switching to newly formed Partizan after the war, was a key player of the national team at both 1950 and 1954 World Cups and at the 1948 and 1952 Olympic tournaments.

The following is a list of Građanski players who earned at least one cap for Kingdom of Yugoslavia national team while playing at the club in the period from 1920 to 1941. Appearances and goals are taken from Football Association of Serbia database, and represent players' career totals. During WW2 the fascist Independent State of Croatia fielded its own FIFA-registered national team which played a total of 15 friendlies between 1941 and 1944. The team was largely composed of Građanski players, and initially managed by Jozo Jakopić, director of Građanski. Players who appeared for Croatia in that period are marked with †. After the war and dissolution of Građanski some of its players were called up to play for the newly established communist SFR Yugoslavia team. Only four players appeared for all three national teams during this politically turbulent period – Miroslav Brozović, Zvonimir Cimermančić, Branko Pleše and Franjo Wölfl).

† Player also appeared for Independent State of Croatia team (1941–1944).
a. Career totals earned for Kingdom of Yugoslavia national team (1920–1941)
b. Olympic tournament squad which the player was on (whether or not he actually played)
c. Player also appeared for the communist SFR Yugoslavia national team, established after World War 2

Managers
List of managers:
1918–1919:  Milan Graf
1919–1921:  Karl Heinlein
1921–1924:  Arthur Gaskell
1924–1925:  Richard Kohn
1925–1926:  Imre Pozsonyi
1926–1929:  Josef Brandstätter 
1930–1931:  Johann Strnad 
1931–1932:  Robert Haftl 
1932–1933:  György Molnár
1933–1935:  James Donnelly
1935–1936:  Hans "Anton" Ringer
1936–1945:  Márton Bukovi

Honours

Domestic competitions
 Kingdom of Yugoslavia Championship:
Winners (5): 1923, 1926, 1928, 1936–37, 1939–40
 Independent State of Croatia Championship:
Winners (2): 1941, 1943
 Kingdom of Yugoslavia Cup:
Winners (2): 1937-38, 1940
 Independent State of Croatia Cup:
Winners (1): 1941

Regional competitions
 Banovina of Croatia Championship:
Winners (1): 1939–40
 Zagreb Subassociation Championship:
Winners (8): 1920, 1922–23, 1923–24, 1924–25, 1925–26, 1927–28, 1942–43, 1943–1944
 Zagreb Subassociation Cup:
Winners (6): 1922–23, 1926–27, 1927–28, 1933–34, 1934–35, 1935–36

European competitions
 Mitropa Cup/Central European Cup:
Semi-finals (1): 1940

Presidents
Andrija Mutafelija (1911–1914)
Artur Weintraub
Vladimir Premrou (1932–1936)
Josip Torbar (1936–1941)

See also
HAŠK Zagreb
Concordia Zagreb
Mitropa Cup
Dinamo Zagreb
Yugoslav First League

References

External links
 Dinamo Zagreb official website with references to Građanski
Season stats and lists of players capped for the national team at RSSSF.com

 
Defunct football clubs in Croatia
Association football clubs established in 1911
Association football clubs disestablished in 1945
Football clubs in Zagreb
Football clubs in Yugoslavia
1911 establishments in Croatia
1945 disestablishments in Croatia